The Khalkha or Kalka (Mongolian script:) have been the largest subgroup of Mongol people in modern Mongolia since the 15th century. The Khalkha, together with Chahars, Ordos and Tumed, were directly ruled by Borjigin khans until the 20th century; unlike the Oirats, who were ruled by Dzungar nobles or the Khorchins, who were ruled by Qasar's descendants.

The two original major Khalkha groups were ruled by the direct male line descendants of Dayan Khan. The Baarin, Khongirad, Jaruud, Bayaud and the O'zeed (Ujeed) became Dayan Khan's fifth son Achibolod's subjects, thus formed the Southern Five Halhs. Seven northern Khalkha otogs: 1) Jalairs, Olkhonud; 2) Besut, Iljigin; 3) Gorlos, Keregut; 4) Khuree, Khoroo, Tsookhor; 5) Khukhuid, Khatagin; 6) Tanghut, Sartuul; 7) Uriankhai became Dayan Khan's youngest (could be third) son Geresenje's subjects. Khotogoids are close in culture and language to the Khalkha Mongols.

There were also numerous direct descendants of Genghis Khan who had formed the ruling class of the Khalkha Mongols prior to the 20th century, but they were and still also regarded as Khalkha Mongols rather than belonging to a special unit.

The Thirteen Khalkhas of the Far North are the major subethnic group of the independent state of Mongolia. They number 1,610,400 (78.8%) of Mongolia's population (1989 figures).

The Khalkha or Halh dialect is the standard written language of Mongolia.

Etymology
The term Халх ("Halh, Khalkha") has always puzzled linguists and historians. One possible interpretation is that it shares the same root as the words xалхавч "shield" and халхлах "to protect; to cover; to shield; to hide; to intercept", although there is no noun or verb xалх that independently exists besides the ethnic group's name. In a similar manner, the sub-ethnic groups within the Khalkha Unit have been historically recorded in books, journals, and documents as "Jalair Khalkha", "Sartuul Khalkha", "Tanghut Khalkha" etc. Even the word order in the phrases Southern Five Khalkha and Northern Thirteen Khalkha implies that the word Халх correlates to the units within the Southern and Northern tribal federations, but it does not stand for the group as a whole. Lastly, Mongolians have always linked the term Халх to the name of the Khalkhyn Gol.

History 

Dayan Khan created the Khalkha Tumen out of Mongols residing in the territory of present-day central Mongolia and northern part of Inner Mongolia. In Mongolian historical sources such as Erdeniin Erih ("The Beads of Jewel") it clearly stated how the Khalkha Tumen was created and where these people resided at the time of its creation. The statement goes as follows:

Transliteration:
Hangai Khand nutuglan suuj
Hari daisind chinu Khalkha bolson
Haluun amind chinu Tushee bolson
Irehiin uzuur, Harahiin haruul bolson
Khalkha tumen chinu Ter bukhii beer ajaamuu

Cyrillic:
Хангай ханд нутаглан сууж
Харь дайсанд чинь халх болсон
Халуун аминд чинь түшээ болсон
Ирэхийн үзүүр, харахын харуул болсон
Халх түмэн чинь тэр бүхий бээр ажаамуу

English translation:
"Dwelling in the Hangai Mountains" (Central Mongolian Mountain range called Hangai Mountain Range, near which Harakorum, the ancient capital, was built)
"A shield (in Mongolian, khalkha means "shield" or "protection") against alien enemies"
"A support for your precious life"
"A blade towards those who come, a guard towards those who look"
"Your Khalkha Tumen is indeed for you"

It is also believed that the Southern Khalkha who now reside in Inner Mongolia were moved south from its original territory Khangai Mountains. To commemorate and signify their origin, every new lunar year all southern Khalkhas perform special Khangai Mountain worshipping ceremonies and they face northwest and pray. This special ceremony is maintained by only southern khalkhas and no other southern Mongols have such rituals.

Under Dayan Khan, the Khalkha were organized as one of three tümen of the Left Wing. Dayan Khan installed the fifth son Alchu Bolad and the eleventh son Geresenje on the Khalkha. The former became the founder of the Five Halh of Southern Mongolia and the latter became the founder of the Seven Halh of the Northern Mongolia. They were called Inner Khalkha and Outer Khalkha respectively, by the Manchus.

Mongolian chronicles called Geresenje as "Khong Tayiji of the Jalayir", which indicates that the core part of the Khalkha were descendants of the Jalayir tribe. By extension, some scholars consider that the Halh had a close connection with the Five Ulus of the Left Wing of the former Yuan dynasty, which was led by the five powerful tribes of Jalayir, Onggirat, Ikires, Uruud and Mangghud.

The Five Halh consisted of five tribes called Jarud, Baarin, Onggirat, Bayaud and Öjiyed. They lived around the Shira Mören valley east of the Greater Khingan. They clashed with but were eventually conquered by the rising Manchus. The Five Khalkha except for the Jarud and the Baarin were organized into the Eight Banners. Note that Khalkha Left Banner of Juu Uda League and Khalkha Right Banner of Ulaanchab League were offshoots of the Seven Khalkha.

The Seven Khalkha were involved in regular fights against the Oyirad in the west. Geresenje's descendants formed the houses of Tüsheet Khan, Zasagt Khan and Setsen Khan. They preserved their independence until they had to seek help from the Kangxi Emperor of the Manchu-led Qing dynasty against the Zungar leader Galdan in 1688. In 1725 the Yongzheng Emperor gave Tsering independence from the house of Tüsheet Khan, forming the house of Sain Noyon Khan.

The Khalkha led the Mongolian independence movement in the 20th century. After enduring countless hardships, they established the independent state of Mongolia in northern Mongolia.

Khalkha diaspora
The overwhelming majority of Khalkha Mongols now reside in the modern state of Mongolia. However, there are four small banners in China: two in Inner Mongolia; one in Qinghai; and one in Rehe. There are also several groups among the Buriats in Russia, however, they no longer retain the Khalkha self-identity, culture, and language. The Halh Mongols in Qinghai, China and the ones among the Buryats in Russia were subjects to Khalkha's Tsogtu Khan and his sons.

The Choghtu Khong Tayiji's Khalkhas (1 banner): Poet, supporter of Ligdan Khan, and opponent of the Dalai Lama's "Yellow Hat" order, Tsogtu Khong Taiji moved to Qinghai with his subjects sometime after 1624. Ligdan Khan and Tsogtu Khong Taiji were supposed to meet in Qinghai and eventually build a Mongol base that is independent of the Manchu rule which was geographically far from the Manchu emperor's reach. Moreover, it was clear to the two Mongol Khans that Tibetan Dalai Lama's influence in Mongol affairs was increasing. So the two decided to end the influence of Dalai Lama and the "Yellow Hat" order by supporting the "Red Hat" order. However, majority of Ligdan Khan's subjects and soldiers died because of smallpox on the way to Qinghai. After Ligdan's death, Tsogtu Taiji began attacking dGe-lugs-pa monasteries. When Tsogtu sent 10,000 men under his son Arslang against the Dalai Lama in Lhasa, Arslang switched sides and supported the Dalai Lama. The dGe-lugs-pa hierarch, the Fifth Dalai Lama (1617–82), summoned the Oirat Güshi Khan Toro-Baiku, whose 10,000 men in early 1637 crushed Tsogtu’s 30,000 at Ulaan-Khoshuu; Tsogtu Taiji was killed. Today the Oirats of Gushi Khan is also known as the "Upper Mongols" or the "ДЭЭД МОНГОЛ", and they still reside in Qinghai forming 21 banners. The remnants of Tsogtu Khong Taiji's Halhs form only one banner and are known as the "Lower Mongols" or "ДООД МОНГОЛ". Tsogtu Khong Taiji is known as Tsogtu Khan among the Khalkha Mongols in Qinghai.

The Khalkha Right Wing Banner: This banner was popularly known as the Darkhan Beili Banner and the ruler of this banner was the descendant of Gersenz Jalair Khan's grandson Bunidari. In 1653 they migrated into Inner Mongolia from the Tusheet Khan Aimak of Outer Mongolia.

The Khalkha East Wing Banner: This banner was popularly known as the "Chokhor Halh" and the ruler of this banner was the descendant of Gombo-Ilden, the fifth generation grandson to Gersenz Jalair Khan. They fled from the Zasakto Khan Aimak of Outer Mongolia to Inner Mongolia in 1664.

The Tanggot Khalkha Banner: This Banner formerly subordinated for administrative purposes to the East Wing Tumet (Monggoljin) Banner, is popularly known as Tanggot Khalkha. There are practically no Chinese, as the surrounding districts are held by Mongols. The tribe, which has a prince of its own, was founded by immigrants from the Jasakto Khan division of Outer Mongolia, who fled to Inner Mongolia and offered submission to the Manchus in 1662, during the wars between the Northern (Khalkha) and Western (Ulot) Mongols.

Loss of Khalkha territory to Imperial Russia and the Buriatized Khalkhas 

During the rise of Genghis Khan in the 12th to 13th centuries, neither the Selenge valley in today's southern Buriatia or the Aga steppe had at this time any connection with the Buriats; these were the lands of the Merkid tribe and the Mongol tribe proper. Starting 1628 with the Russian Conquest and Buriat Migration, the Selenge Valley, as before, was inhabited by Mongol clans under the rule of the Khalkha khans. By 1652 the Khalkha khans were protesting the Russian incursions into Transbaikalia, and from 1666 on Khalkha raiding parties reached as far as Bratsk, Ilimsk, Yeravninsk, and Nerchinsk, while the khans besieged the forts on the Selenge. At the same time, however, the Khoris along the Uda River in 1647 surrendered as a block to the Russians to escape paying tribute to the Khalkhas. Smaller Mongol clan fragments also defected north to the protection of Cossack forts. The invasion of Khalkha by Galdan Boshogtu Khan in 1688 stopped Khalkha resistance to the Cossack advance and sent more Mongol refugees fleeing into Russian control.

Finally, the Selenge Mongols, cut off by the new border from their Khalkha kinsmen and mixed with displaced Buriats and Khori, gradually accepted the Russian designation as Buriat. These groups are: Descendants of Okhin Taij (grandson of Khalkha's Tsogtu Khan); Khatagin; Atagan; Ashabagad; Sartuul; Tavnanguud; Yungsiebu; O'zeed; Uuld; Tsongool. The Tsongool subclans are as follows: 1. Uriankhad, 2. Bolingud, 3. Baatud, 4. Ashibagad, 5. Avgachuud, 6. Sharnuud, 7. Nomkhod, 8. Khamnigan, 9. Arshaantan, 10. Khorchid, 11. Naimantan, 12. Yunshööbü, 13. Khotgoid, 14. Eljiged, 15. Örlüüd, 16. Tavnanguud, 17. Orongoi, 18. Tsookhor, 19. Sartuul, 20. Sharaid, 21. Temdegten.

Mongolian academician, writer, and scholar Byambyn Renchin is a representative of this ethnic group. His father belonged to the Yungshiebu tribe and his mother was a direct descendant of Genghis Khan through Khalkha's Tsogtu Khan.

References

Citations

Sources 

 Morikawa Tetsuo 森川哲雄: Haruha Tumen to Sono Seiritsu ni Tsuite ハルハ・トゥメンとその成立について, Tōyō Gakuhō 東洋学報 Vol. 55, No. 2, pp. 32–63, 1972.
 Okada Hidehiro 岡田英弘: Dayan Hān no Rokumanko no Kigen ダヤン・ハーンの六万戸の起源, Enoki Hakushi Kanreki Kinen Tōyōshi Ronsō 榎博士還暦記念東洋史論叢, pp. 127–137, 1975.
 Atwood, Christopher. "Khalkha.", "Tsogtu Taiji.", and "Buriats." Encyclopedia of Mongolia and the Mongol Empire. 2006.
 Lattimore, Owen. The Mongols of Manchuria. Rahway: Quinn & Boden Company, Inc., 1934
 Shabad, Theodore. China's Changing Map. New York: Praeger Publishers, Inc., 2nd ed. 1972
 Shirnen.B Б. Ширнэн: Buriadyn Noudel Hel Ayalgouny Ouchir Буриадын Нүүдэл-Хэл Аялгууны Учир, pp. 67–70, 2005.

Mongols
Ethnic groups in Mongolia
Khalkha